SLATES (Search, Links, Authorship, Tags, Extensions, Signalling) is an initialism that describes the business impacting capabilities, derived from the effective use of Web 2.0 technologies in and across enterprises.

Origin of the term
This acronym refers to the key elements in the phenomena often referred to as Enterprise 2.0, which was defined by Professor Andrew McAfee as “the use of emergent social software platforms within companies, or between companies and their partners or customers”

Components
Search is traditionally defined as "A web search query is a query that a user enters into web search engine to satisfy their information needs. Web search queries are distinctive in that they are unstructured and often ambiguous; they vary greatly from standard query languages which are governed by strict syntax rules."
The term in the context of SLATES refers to effective use of such search queries in and across enterprise boundaries, for example being able to enhance the "discoverability of information which drives re-use, leverage and ROI".

Links are the use of links or uniform resource identifiers to forge deep interconnections between the information content across collaborating enterprises.

Authorship is the ability of all individuals within and across enterprises to easily publish content accessible across collaborating enterprises.

Tags is the use of tags to enable the rapid and humanistic organisation of data across collaborating enterprises.

Extensions are the mining of previously gathered data relating to a users activities or transactions which allows users to be guided to initiate other valuable activities or transactions. Exemplified by the phrase "other customers who purchased this book also purchased these books"

Signalling involves the sending of alerts to users of the changing state of an element of interest i.e. using RSS. Exemplified by the Online Status of other users in instant messaging clients

References

Web 2.0 neologisms